Biogenous ooze is a type of marine sediment composed of a high percentage of organic compounds.

Composition 
Biogenous ooze consists of organic compounds, usually in the form of microorganism tests that fall from closer to the ocean surface to the ocean floor after death. For marine sediment to receive this classification, it must be composed of more than 30% skeletal material. The two primary types of ooze are siliceous, which is composed primarily of silica (SiO2), and calcareous or carbonate, which is mostly calcium carbonate (CaCO3). In an area in which biogenous is the dominant sediment type, the composition of microorganisms in that location determines to which category it is classified. The primary types of microorganisms used to classify ooze are radiolarians and diatoms (siliceous) and coccolithophores and foraminifera (calcareous). The presence of these organisms can lead to sub-classifications based upon their dominance.

Distribution 

Despite the common association between shallow water and high productivity, biogenous ooze is not as common around continental shelves. This is due to the transport of terrigenous sediments by methods such as river and wind from the continents. The terrigenous sediment buries most accumulated organic material, preventing enough biological material from being present for it to be classified as biogenous. Along some areas of terrigenous sediment are siliceous ooze. This is due to siliceous ooze being more abundant in areas of cooler, more nutrient rich water.  The nutrients allow for the abundant growth of microorganisms, and silica dissolves slower in cooler water, allowing adequate time for deposition.

Calcareous sediments are more common in the deep ocean, comprising about half of its surface area. However, the deepest parts of the ocean are dominated by abyssal clay instead. This is because calcareous ooze is limited by the calcite compensation depth (CCD). The CCD varies around the world and is based upon temperature, with it occurring by approximately 4000-5000 meters deep. This is because calcium carbonate dissolves faster in cooler water, so as water temperature decreases with depth, its deposition rate also decreases. The temperature dependence also means that calcareous ooze is more likely to be present in warmer waters, which also leads to its dominance in shallow areas surrounding tropical and subtropical islands that do not have much terrigenous sediment runoff.

References 
5. Rothwell, R.G. “Sedimentary Rocks: Deep Ocean Pelagic Oozes☆.” Reference Module in Earth Systems and Environmental Sciences, 2016, https://doi.org/10.1016/b978-0-12-409548-9.10493-2.
Oceanography
Sediments
Sedimentary rocks